Symphyllocarpus is a genus of flowering plants in the daisy family. The genus is poorly known, and botanists have not reached a consensus as to its evolutionary relations.

Species
The only known species is Symphyllocarpus exilis, native to northeastern China (Jilin, Heilongjiang) and southeastern Russia (Amur, Primorye, Irkutsk).

References

Monotypic Asteraceae genera
Flora of the Russian Far East
Flora of Manchuria